"You Still Touch Me" is a song by the English musician Sting, released as the second single from his fifth studio album Mercury Falling. Featuring a distinct soul influence, the song reached number 27 in Sting's native UK, becoming the second of three singles from the album to reach the top 40.

Background

Much like "Let Your Soul Be Your Pilot", "You Still Touch Me" was influenced by soul musicians such as Otis Redding and Marvin Gaye and was intended as a homage to soul music in general. Sting described the track as "a standard song of love and loss".

"You Still Touch Me" peaked at number 27 in the UK, marking a downward turn from Sting's previous single. In the US, it reached number 60, an improvement over "Let Your Soul Be Your Pilot", which peaked at number 86. Much like the previous single, "You Still Touch Me" was most successful in Canada, matching its predecessor's number 7 placement.

Track listing

All tracks written by Sting, except "Lullaby to An Anxious Child", written with Dominic Miller.

CD1

 "You Still Touch Me" (Edit) – 3:18
 "Lullaby to An Anxious Child" – 1:56
 "Beneath a Desert Moon" – 4:28
 "You Still Touch Me" – 3:46

CD2

 "You Still Touch Me" (Edit) – 3:18
 "Sister Moon" (Hani Commissioned Club Mix) – 7:56
 "Sister Moon" (Hani Commissioned Dub Mix) – 7:12

US CD single

 "You Still Touch Me" – 3:18
 "Twenty Five to Midnight" – 4:07

Charts

References

1996 songs
1996 singles
Sting (musician) songs
Songs written by Sting (musician)